Logan Cunningham is an American actor. He is best known for his voice roles in video games developed and published by American independent video game development studio Supergiant Games. Cunningham's voice over work in video game titles has received recognition from multiple industry awards: in 2021 he was conferred the Performer in a Supporting Role BAFTA Award for his work as multiple characters in the roguelike video game Hades.

Career
The 2011 title Bastion is Logan Cunningham's first acting project in the video game industry. He agreed to participate in the project as a personal favor for his friends. As the principal voice actor of Bastion, Cunningham worked closely with the game's audio director Darren Korb and recorded his lines as the game's narrator from a small closet within an apartment in New York. Bastion critical and commercial success allowed Cunningham the opportunity to resign from his job at a movie theater to undertake full-time work as an actor. Cunningham hosted the inaugural New York Game Awards at the Cantor Film Center in 2012.

Cunningham would continue his role as the principal voice actor of subsequent titles developed and published by Supergiant Games, sometimes voicing multiple characters as in 2017's Pyre and 2020's Hades. Cunningham plays six different named roles in Hades: Lord Hades, Poseidon, Achilles, Charon, Asterius, and The Storyteller. Cunningham also voiced the game's patch notes during its early access developmental period. 

Cunningham has received critical acclaim for his video game voice acting work, which has been described by critics like Eurogamer staff and Jordan Devore from Destructoid as an essential element that positively impacted the critical success enjoyed by Supergiant Games' titles. Notable accolades received by Cunningham include the Lead Performance in a Comedy NAVGTR Award in 2012 for his role in Bastion, as well as the Performer in a Supporting Role at the 2021 BAFTA Games Awards for his roles in Hades. In May 2021, Cunningham was the subject of a webinar event titled "Games Performance Masterclass" hosted by BAFTA.

Personal life
Cunningham grew up in the Bay Area and San Jose in the state of California. Cunningham is a childhood friend of Amit Rao, the co-founder of Supergiant Games. They met each other through youth soccer events. Cunningham later attended a high school which has a well developed theater program, where he became acquainted with Darren Korb. Cunningham, Korb and Rao all moved to New York for their college education; Cunningham in particular attended the Lincoln Center campus of Fordham University.

Works

Video games

Film

Television

Accolades

References

External links

 Twitter account

Year of birth missing (living people)
American male film actors
American male television actors
American video game actors
American voice actors
21st-century African-American people
Living people